UFC Fight Night: Evans vs. Salmon (also known as UFC Fight Night 8) was a mixed martial arts event held by the Ultimate Fighting Championship on  January 25, 2007 at the Seminole Hard Rock Hotel and Casino in Hollywood, Florida.  It was broadcast live in the United States and Canada on Spike TV.

Background
This card featured the UFC debut of PRIDE and Hero's veteran Heath Herring.  Originally scheduled for the main card was a bout between middleweight contestants Nate Marquardt and Dean Lister; it is believed that Spike TV influenced the eventual decision to remove the bout from the main card.

Results

Bonus awards
The following are the winner of the event's bonus awards given by the UFC.
Fight of the Night: Spencer Fisher vs. Hermes Franca
Knockout of the Night: Rashad Evans
Submission of the Night: Ed Herman

Official salaries
The following figures are based on the fighter salary information that the UFC is required by law to submit to the state athletic commissions, including the winners' bonuses.

See also
 Ultimate Fighting Championship
 List of UFC champions
 List of UFC events
 2007 in UFC

References

External links
Official UFC past events page
UFC events results at Sherdog.com

UFC Fight Night
2007 in mixed martial arts
Mixed martial arts in Florida
Sports in Hollywood, Florida
2007 in sports in Florida
Events in Hollywood, Florida